Takengon is a town in Aceh, Indonesia. The town itself sits on three administrative districts of the Central Aceh Regency - Bebesen, Kebayakan, and Lut Tawar, and acts as the seat of Central Aceh Regency. The town is in the highlands of western Sumatra, situated on the shores of Lake Laut Tawar. The region around Takengon is well known for its coffee. Takengon is a plateau with cool air with an altitude of about 1200 m above sea level. Around Takengon there are many tourist attractions, including Lake Laut Tawar in Laut Tawar sub-district, Bebesen sub-district and Kebayakan sub-district, Puteri Pukes Cave in Kebayakan sub-district and Pantan Terong in Bebesen sub-district.

Takengon residents consist of various tribes and ethnicities. The majority of Takengon's population is Gayo people or as they're usually called, "urang Gayo", besides that there are many other tribes such as Acehnese people, Javanese, Batak, Minangkabau, Karo people (Indonesia), The Mandailing and Ethnic descendants of Tionghoa. The Gayo are the native people of Takengon.

History
During the 11th century, a Gayo kingdom known as Linge existed in the vicinity of Takengon in Central Aceh. Following the Aceh War and the intrusion of Dutch colonialism, the region was established as an Onderafdeeling in 1904, with Takengon as its seat. Due to Takengon's location in the highlands, Dutch authorities assumed that it would be able to sustain commercial plantations, and despite the poor road connections and infrastructure in the region agricultural commodities became making inroads in Takengon. 1914 saw the opening of a road connecting Takengon to Bireuën, allowing the entry of commercial firms who opened pine and coffee plantations.

On September 1953, Takengon fell under Darul Islam hands. The town was occupied by Darul Islam Forces for two months. TNI captured the town at the end of November 1953.

Following Indonesian independence, Takengon was organised as the administrative seat of Central Aceh Regency, which initially also included modern Gayo Lues and Bener Meriah until they were split out in 1974 and 2003 respectively.

Transports 
Takengon is served by the Bener Meriah Rembele Airport , which on March 3, 2016, has been improved to accommodate bigger airplanes with 30 by 2,250 metres square runway, 95 by 150 metres square apron and 1,000 metres square terminal to serve up to 200,000 passengers per year. Currently Rembele Airport has about 4,000 passengers a year.

Climate
Takengon has a tropical rainforest climate (Af) with moderate to heavy rainfall year-round.

Gallery

References

Populated places in Aceh
Regency seats of Aceh